Doranda College, established in 1962, is a degree college in Ranchi, Jharkhand, India. It offers undergraduate courses in commerce, arts, sciences. Faculty of Management Studies offers postgraduate courses in MBA, M.Com. and Master of Rural Management. It is affiliated to  Ranchi University.

Accreditation
Doranda College is accredited with B+ grade by the National Assessment and Accreditation Council (NAAC).

See also
Education in India
Literacy in India
List of institutions of higher education in Jharkhand

References

External links

Colleges affiliated to Ranchi University
Educational institutions established in 1962
Universities and colleges in Ranchi
Universities and colleges in Jharkhand
1962 establishments in Bihar